Edward and Caroline is a 1951 French comedy-drama film directed by Jacques Becker, starring Daniel Gélin and Anne Vernon. It was entered into the 1951 Cannes Film Festival.

The film's sets were designed by the art director Jacques Colombier. It was shot at the Billancourt Studios in Paris.

Plot
Édouard and Caroline are preparing for a family evening during which Édouard will be expected to play the piano. Lacking a dinner jacket Édouard goes to borrow one from his wife's cousin. In the meantime, Caroline attempts to re-model her dress to bring it more up-to-date. Her husband is not pleased and the evening consists of rows, fights and threats of divorce. It is the early morning before life returns to normal.

Cast
 Daniel Gélin as Edouard Mortier
 Anne Vernon as Caroline Mortier
 Elina Labourdette as Florence Borch de Martelie
 Jacques François as Alain Beauchamp
 Betty Stockfeld as Lucy Barville
 Jean Galland as Claude Beauchamp
 Jean Marsac as a guest
 William Tubbs as Spencer Borch
 Jean Toulout as Herbert Barville
 Yette Lucas as Mme Leroy, la concierge
 Jean Riveyre as Julien, le valet de chambre
 Hélène Duc as L'invitée mélomane
 Micheline Rolla as a guest
 Edmond Ardisson as Le coiffeur
 Grégoire Gromoff as Igor

References

External links

1951 films
1951 comedy films
French black-and-white films
Films directed by Jacques Becker
French comedy films
1950s French-language films
Films produced by Raymond Borderie
Films shot at Billancourt Studios
1950s French films